Lotus Isle Amusement Park was an amusement park that operated from 1930 to 1932 on Tomahawk Island in Portland, Oregon. Known as the "Wonderland of the Pacific Northwest", Lotus Isle was located just east of the more successful Jantzen Beach amusement park.

History
Lotus Isle Amusement Park opened on June 28, 1930 after a group of investors realized the success of the nearby Jantzen Beach Amusement Park. At the time of its opening, Lotus Isle was the largest amusement park in Oregon. The park consisted of forty attractions including bumper cars, a rollercoaster, and a dance hall called the Peacock Ballroom.

On August 28, 1930, an eleven-year-old boy drowned at the Lotus Isle beach after slipping from a ladder beneath the park's main diving board. Edwin F. Platt, the park's owner, committed suicide the day after the drowning. Platt "spent a fortune" in constructing Lotus Isle, which cost between $500,000 and $600,000. According to  The Oregonian, finances were given consideration in the inquiry following Platt's death. Business at the park had not been as brisk as its investors had hoped for, and it experienced "internal discord" such as the discharge of its manager, T. H. Eslick, who later sued the park for violating the agreement whereby he was brought on as manager.

For the following season, a promoter named Al Painter took over management of the park, and created a "Dance-A-Thon" event in the park's Peacock Ballroom, which held room for 6,600 dancers. During this time, John Ringling sold Lotus Isle a temperamental bull elephant named "Tusko" who soon destroyed several pavilions after being spooked by a low-flying stunt plane. The elephant, which had previously rampaged through Sedro-Woolley, Washington, eventually ended up in Seattle's Woodland Park Zoo.

On August 24, 1931, almost a year after the drowning and Platt's suicide, the Peacock Ballroom burned to the ground. The park operated once more in the 1932 season before going into bankruptcy, after which liquidation of the park property began.

Attractions
 "Whiz" - wood roller coaster
 Alpine Scenic Railway
 Bulldog Bumper Cars
  neon Eiffel Tower sign at the entrance
 1914 Herschell-Spillman menagerie merry-go-round -- currently located in San Francisco's Golden Gate Park

See also
Jantzen Beach Amusement Park
Oaks Amusement Park

References

External links

1930 establishments in Oregon
Amusement parks in Oregon
Defunct amusement parks in the United States
History of Portland, Oregon
Hayden Island, Portland, Oregon
Northeast Portland, Oregon
1932 disestablishments in Oregon